Kunstler is a German surname meaning "artist". Notable people with the surname include:

Emily Kunstler, activist and documentary filmmaker
Franz Künstler, last known surviving veteran of the First World War who fought for the Austro-Hungarian Empire
James Howard Kunstler (born 1948), American author
Karl Künstler (1901–1945), German Nazi SS concentration camp commandant
Mort Künstler (born 1931), American artist
William Kunstler (1919–1995), American lawyer and activist

German-language surnames
Jewish surnames
Occupational surnames